The 2019 Torneo Internacional Challenger León was a professional tennis tournament played on hard courts. It was the seventeenth edition of the tournament which was part of the 2019 ATP Challenger Tour. It took place in León, Mexico between 22 and 28 April 2019.

Singles main-draw entrants

Seeds

 1 Rankings are as of April 15, 2019.

Other entrants
The following players received wildcards into the singles main draw:
  Milledge Cossu
  Lucas Gómez
  Gerardo López Villaseñor
  Luis Patiño

The following player received entry into the singles main draw using a protected ranking:
  Carlos Gómez-Herrera

The following players received entry into the singles main draw using their ITF World Tennis Ranking:
  Andrés Artuñedo
  Baptiste Crepatte
  Manuel Guinard
  Skander Mansouri
  João Menezes

The following players received entry from the qualifying draw:
  Felipe Mantilla
  Martin Redlicki

The following player received entry as a lucky loser:
  Camilo Ugo Carabelli

Champions

Singles

 Blaž Rola def.  Liam Broady 6–4, 4–6, 6–3.

Doubles

 Lucas Miedler /  Sebastian Ofner def.  Matt Reid /  John-Patrick Smith 4–6, 6–4, [10–6].

References

External links
Official Website

Torneo Internacional Challenger León
2019
2019 in Mexican tennis
April 2019 sports events in Mexico